Henry Clay White (1848-1927) was an American chemist, notable for his contributions to agricultural science and higher education. He was also an early proponent of Darwin's theory of evolution.

Biography
Henry Clay White was born in Baltimore on December 30, 1848.

He married Ella Frances Roberts on December 19, 1872.

From 1872 to 1927, he was professor of chemistry at the University of Georgia. In 1893 he was elected as a member of the Royal Society of Chemistry.

He died on November 30, 1927, in Athens, Georgia.

References

1848 births
1927 deaths
20th-century American chemists
19th-century American chemists